Elizabeth "Britt" Cagle Grant (born February 1, 1978) is an American attorney and judge who is a United States circuit judge of the United States Court of Appeals for the Eleventh Circuit. She is a former Justice of the Supreme Court of Georgia.

Early life and legal career 
Grant was born Elizabeth Britt Cagle in 1978 in Atlanta, Georgia. Grant attended high school at The Westminster Schools.  She studied English literature and politics at Wake Forest University, graduating with a Bachelor of Arts summa cum laude in 2000.

From 2000 to 2004, Grant worked for then-Congressman Nathan Deal in Washington, D.C., and served in various roles in the administration of President George W. Bush. She then attended Stanford Law School, where she was a managing editor of the Stanford Journal of International Law and a senior articles editor of the Stanford Law and Policy Review. Grant also served as president of the school's Federalist Society chapter. She graduated with a Juris Doctor with distinction in 2007.

Grant was thereafter a law clerk to then-Judge Brett Kavanaugh of the United States Court of Appeals for the District of Columbia Circuit.

State Solicitor General and appointment to state Supreme Court 
From 2015 to 2017, Grant was Solicitor General for the State of Georgia. On January 1, 2017, Governor Nathan Deal appointed her to a seat on the Supreme Court of Georgia. On November 17, 2017, Grant was named by President Donald Trump as a potential nominee to the Supreme Court of the United States. On August 3, 2018, her service on the state supreme court was terminated when she was elevated to the United States Court of Appeals for the Eleventh Circuit.

Federal judicial service 
On April 10, 2018, President Trump nominated Grant to serve as a United States Circuit Judge of the United States Court of Appeals for the Eleventh Circuit. She was nominated to the seat vacated by Judge Julie E. Carnes, who assumed senior status on June 18, 2018. On May 23, 2018, a hearing on her nomination was held before the Senate Judiciary Committee. On July 19, 2018, her nomination was reported out of committee by an 11–10 vote. On July 30, 2018, the United States Senate voted 52–44 to invoke cloture on her nomination. On July 31, 2018, Grant was confirmed by a 52–46 vote. She received her judicial commission on August 3, 2018.

In November 2020, Grant wrote for the divided panel majority when it found that a municipality's ban on minor conversion therapy violated the First Amendment to the United States Constitution

Personal life
She is married to Justin G. Grant, who worked for the Central Intelligence Agency. They have three children.

Electoral history 
2018

See also 
 Donald Trump Supreme Court candidates

References

External links 
 
 
 Contributor profile from the Federalist Society
 Profile at the Supreme Court of Georgia
 

|-

|-

1978 births
Living people
21st-century American lawyers
21st-century American judges
Employees of the United States House of Representatives
Federalist Society members
George W. Bush administration personnel
Georgia (U.S. state) lawyers
Judges of the United States Court of Appeals for the Eleventh Circuit
People associated with Kirkland & Ellis
Solicitors General of Georgia
Stanford Law School alumni
Justices of the Supreme Court of Georgia (U.S. state)
United States court of appeals judges appointed by Donald Trump
Wake Forest University alumni
21st-century American women lawyers
21st-century American women judges